Snorum is a village, nowadays more like a farm, in Jörns socken, Skellefteå Municipality, Västerbotten County, Sweden.

The village got its name in the 19th century when a geographical surveyor played with the childish rhyme Snipp, snapp, snorum, hej basalorum and named five new populated places in the Jörn Parish each after a word in the rhyme. Snipp, Snapp, Hej and Basalorum are four other villages in the vicinity.

References

Villages in Sweden
Populated places in Västerbotten County